Slobodka is a rural locality (a village) in Turovetskoye Rural Settlement, Mezhdurechensky District, Vologda Oblast, Russia. The population was 11 as of 2002.

Geography 
Slobodka is located 254 km northeast of Shuyskoye (the district's administrative centre) by road. Golubi is the nearest rural locality.

References 

Rural localities in Mezhdurechensky District, Vologda Oblast